The men's 800 metres event at the 2020 Summer Olympics took place between 31 July and 4 August 2021 at the Japan National Stadium. In total 48 athletes were to start, but only 47 (from 29 nations) actually did. Emmanuel Korir of Kenya won the event, with his countryman Ferguson Rotich taking silver. It was the fourth consecutive victory in the men's 800 metres for Kenya. Patryk Dobek earned bronze, giving Poland its first medal in the event.

Summary
The 800 metres was far less predictable than other events. World record holder and double Olympic Champion, David Rudisha was not back to defend the title. Silver medalist Taoufik Makhloufi also did not make it to Tokyo, though bronze medalist Clayton Murphy did. 2019 World Champion Donavan Brazier failed to qualify at the US Trials. Brazier had also been number 1 ranked in 2020, with his teammate Bryce Hoppel number two. 2012 silver medalist Nijel Amos had the world leading time while beating Emmanuel Korir in Monaco. World Championship silver medalist, kicker Amel Tuka, bronze medalist Ferguson Rotich and 2017 World Champion Pierre-Ambroise Bosse were also in the field.

Patryk Dobek, Peter Bol, and Rotich were the semi final winners, all qualifiers fairly evenly matched by time, except Amos who tripped and tripped over NCAA Champion Isaiah Jewett as both were about to kick for home. Jewett helped Amos to his feet in a sportsmanship scene that was later repeated in commercials. The two jogged across the finish line, Amos being granted a place in the final by the referee.

Nine athletes on a 9 lane track, all evenly matched, the start had what would be expected, a tight pack trying to sort out position. Emmanuel Korir took the inside position, Bol directly to his outside but they were all running, almost jogging well within their capabilities. The first time down the home stretch, they lined up with six men shoulder to shoulder a step behind Bol. Bol took the bell at 53.76 predicating a fast second lap for gold. Through the turn, the next 100 metres produced some separation, Bol leading Korir, Amos and Patryk Dobek in a lead group, Rotich ahead of the second pack trying to bridge the gap. The kickers, Tuka and Murphy at the back of the pack, ready to pounce. Down the backstretch, Korir and Dobek tightened up on Bol, Amos going backward. Through the final turn, Korir took the longer way in lane 2 to have running room around Bol. The entire pack tightened up again, Rotich hugging the rail, Dobek following Korir and Amos trying to widen up on Dobek, with Tuka and Murphy swinging wide to sprint down the outside. Everybody was in their place for the sprint to home. Korir opened up a gap as Dobek ran down lane 2 to get past Bol on the inside. Leaning and rocking side to side awkwardly, Rotich kept gaining, squeezing between Dobek and Bol. Everybody was in full sprint, but after Dobek got past Bol, only the two Kenyans were making forward progress relative to each other. The kickers were not running past burnt out runners because they were not burnt out from the fast first lap. The World and Olympic Record time passed and Korir still had over 30 metres to run. Bol moved backward toward the pack, the three medalists distinct. Rotich gained and leaned at the finish but he was still over a metre away from catching Korir for gold. Dobek was elated to get bronze.

Background
This was the 29th appearance of the event, which is one of 12 athletics events to have been held at every Summer Olympics.

For the first time in Olympic history, no nations appeared in the event for the first time. Great Britain made its 28th appearance, most among all nations, having had no competitors in the event only in the 1904 Games in St. Louis.

Qualification

A National Olympic Committee (NOC) could enter up to 3 qualified athletes in the men's 800 metres event if all athletes meet the entry standard or qualify by ranking during the qualifying period. (The limit of 3 has been in place since the 1930 Olympic Congress.) The qualifying standard is 1:45.20. This standard was "set for the sole purpose of qualifying athletes with exceptional performances unable to qualify through the IAAF World Rankings pathway." The world rankings, based on the average of the best five results for the athlete over the qualifying period and weighted by the importance of the meet, will then be used to qualify athletes until the cap of 48 is reached.

The qualifying period was originally from 1 May 2019 to 29 June 2020. Due to the COVID-19 pandemic, the period was suspended from 6 April 2020 to 30 November 2020, with the end date extended to 29 June 2021. The world rankings period start date was also changed from 1 May 2019 to 30 June 2020; athletes who had met the qualifying standard during that time were still qualified, but those using world rankings would not be able to count performances during that time. The qualifying time standards could be obtained in various meets during the given period that have the approval of the IAAF. Both indoor and outdoor meets are eligible. The most recent Area Championships may be counted in the ranking, even if not during the qualifying period.

NOCs can also use their universality place—each NOC can enter one male athlete regardless of time if they had no male athletes meeting the entry standard for an athletics event—in the 800 metres.

Entry number: 48. None qualified by ranking.

Competition format
The event continued to use the three-round format that has been typical (though with exceptions) in the 800 metres since 1912.

Records
Prior to this competition, the existing world, Olympic, and area records were as follows.

The following national records were established during the competition:

Schedule
All times are Japan Standard Time (UTC+9)

The men's 800 metres took place over three separate days.

Results

Round 1 
Qualification Rules: First 3 in each heat (Q) and the next 6 fastest (q) advance to the semifinals.

Heat 1

Heat 2

Heat 3

Heat 4

Heat 5

Heat 6

Semifinals 
Progression rules: First 2 in each heat (Q) and the next 2 fastest (q) advance to the final.

Semifinal 1

Semifinal 2

Semifinal 3

Final

References

Men's 800 metres
2020
Men's events at the 2020 Summer Olympics